Carlos Alberto Kiese Wiesner (born  1 June 1957) is a former football coach and sports journalist who served as Paraguay's defensive midfielder.

Playing career
As a player, was highlighted in the Selection of Paraguay and the Club Olimpia of his country to win both, between 1975 and 1983, several local and international titles, such as Copa America, Copa Libertadores and Intercontinental Cup from 1979.

Managerial career
In his role as coach, they won the championship in the Primera División, 1996 leading to Club Cerro Porteño from Assumption. Recently, during the Clausura 2009 he served as head coach of Olimpia Asunción of Paraguay. However, resigned over a disagreement with the policy of playing just before the 19th day he found his team in third place 3 points behind the leader.

References

1957 births
Living people
Paraguayan people of German descent
Paraguayan footballers
Association football midfielders
Club Olimpia footballers
Grêmio Foot-Ball Porto Alegrense players
Club Atlético Independiente footballers
Club Libertad footballers
Cerro Porteño players
Paraguay international footballers
1979 Copa América players
Copa América-winning players
Paraguayan expatriate footballers
Paraguayan expatriate sportspeople in Brazil
Expatriate footballers in Brazil
Paraguayan football managers
Paraguay national football team managers
Cerro Porteño managers
Club Olimpia managers
Club Libertad managers
Club Tacuary managers
Club América managers
Paraguayan Primera División managers
1991 Copa América managers
Paraguayan expatriate football managers
Paraguayan expatriate sportspeople in Mexico
Expatriate football managers in Mexico
Sportivo Luqueño managers